Gipping Great Wood is a  biological Site of Special Scientific Interest south of Gipping in Suffolk.

This is an ancient coppice with standards wood with a variety of woodland types. There are many hornbeams, and other trees include oak and ash. Wet rides, a pond and a stream provide additional ecological interest.

The site is private land with no public access.

References

Sites of Special Scientific Interest in Suffolk